Arthur MacArthur is the name of:

Arthur MacArthur Sr. (1815–1896), lieutenant governor of Wisconsin and acting governor for four days; United States federal judge
Arthur MacArthur Jr. (1845–1912), his son, general in the United States Army and the Military Governor of the occupied Philippines
Arthur MacArthur III (1876–1923), his son, captain in the United States Navy
Arthur MacArthur IV (born 1938), son of Douglas MacArthur and Jean MacArthur

See also
Arthur McArthur (born 1988), Canadian music producer
Arthur McArthur (politician) (1884 – after 1933), Australian politician